"King Snipe" is a song by American rappers Gucci Mane and Kodak Black, released on January 13, 2023 with an accompanying music video. It was produced by YC, Skywalker OG and DrumGod.

Background
Gucci Mane teased the collaboration on social media with footage of Kodak Black dancing to the song during a studio session.

Composition
The song features the "distinct trappy sound" of Kodak Black, who starts the song with a triumphant verse. Gucci Mane's performance has been regarded as reminiscent of the style in his early mixtapes.

Music video
The music video finds the rappers partying at night in a club, where they perform in front of a "purple-lit" crowd of fans. They also hang out in the parking lot in front of "flashy" cars and spend time in a recording studio.

Charts

References

2023 singles
2023 songs
Gucci Mane songs
Kodak Black songs
Songs written by Gucci Mane
Songs written by Kodak Black
Atlantic Records singles